A number of steamships have been named Palmyra, including:

, a Bock, Godeffroy & Co cargo ship in service 1957–62
, a Deutsche Levant Linie cargo ship in service 1944–45

Ship names